Gian Maria Rastellini (20 January 1869 – 30 December 1927) was an Italian neo-impressionist painter.

Biography 
Gian Maria Rastellini was born in Buttogno, a small village in the Valle Vigezzo, to a well-to-do family and was introduced to painting first by his paternal grandfather, Gian Battista Rastellini, then by his father, Gian Giacomo. In 1881 he enrolled, very young, at the Rossetti Valentini Art School in Santa Maria Maggiore, where together with Maurizio Borgnis, Carlo Fornara and Giovanni Battista Ciolina he studied under the guidance of the master Enrico Cavalli until 1887. A precocious artist, he exhibited at the First Triennale of Brera with the painting Il Sogno (The Dream), which was shortlisted by the jury for the Principe Umberto Prize. The same picture was presented at the International Exhibition of the Munich Secession in 1907, where it was awarded a gold medal.

His earliest works were a compelling sequence of portraits, remarkable for their expressiveness and formal vigour. In 1889 he moved with his brother Gian Battista, also a painter, to Milan where he opened a studio. Building on the teachings of Cavalli, he made the lessons of the most open-minded and innovative artists his own, with his work assuming a vaguely symbolist tone. Perhaps his most original production of the 1890s are the scenes and landscapes he painted in Valle Vigezzo such as Interno di stalla (Interior of a stable), Paesaggio invernale verso Buttogno (Winter landscape looking towards Buttogno), Veduta autunnale della valletta (Autumn view of the valley), and Vita umile (Humble life), dictated by autonomous stylistic choices, fruit of a mediation between his early education and his study of Impressionism and the Macchiaioli. Also worthy of note are the portraits in pastels, a technique the artist made full use of throughout the entire arc of his artistic activity.

A multifaceted personality, Rastellini held the offices of Mayor of Buttogno (1899-1902) and president of the Società Elettrica Vigezzina, the Valley's electricity company. Passionate about art and a collector, he made several trips to different parts of Europe to see the great masterpieces preserved in the art galleries and churches. Around 1905, his production ground almost to a halt and from then on he focused exclusively on commissioned portraits. The artist died in 1927 in Milan.

Exhibitions 
 "Una scuola di pittura in Val Vigezzo: 1881-1919": Turin/Novara, 1990
 "Gian Maria Rastellini 1869-1927": Pallanza, 1996
 "Alessandro Poscio, collezionista appassionato": Domodossola, 2014
 "Carlo Fornara e il ritratto vigezzino": Domodossola, 2015
 "Brera 1891. L'esposizione che rivoluzionò l'arte moderna": Milan, 2016

Literature 
 Thieme-Becker: "Allgemeines Lexikon der Bildenden Künstler von der Antike bis zur Gegenwart", Seemann, Leipzig, 1907-1950
 Benezit Dictionary of Artists, Librairie Gründ. Paris, 2006
 Guido Cesura: "Enrico Cavalli e la pittura vigezzina", Colombi, Milan, 1974
 Davide Ramoni: "Scuola di belle arti Rossetti Valentini in Santa Maria Maggiore. Vicende e contributi alla pittura vigezzina nel centenario della fondazione", tip. S. Gaudenzio, Novara, 1978
 Dario Gnemmi: "Una scuola di pittura in Val Vigezzo: 1881-1919. Carlo Giuseppe ed Enrico Cavalli, Giovanni Battista Ciolina, Carlo Fornara", Il Quadrante, Turin, 1990
 Guido Cesura: "Enrico Cavalli pittore", Grossi, Domodossola, 1993
 Dario Gnemmi: "Retour à la ferme", Biglia Club, Domodossola, 1993
 Sergio Rebora, "Gian Maria Rastellini 1869-1927", Quaderni del Museo del Paesaggio, Pallanza, 1996
 Francesco Ferrari: "La scuola di belle arti Rossetti Valentini in Santa Maria Maggiore", Grossi, Domodossola, 1999
 Dario Gnemmi: "Monticelli e la scuola di Enrico Cavalli", Madame Webb, Domodossola, 2006
 Dario Gnemmi: "Vigezzini di Francia. Pittura d'alpe e d'Oltralpe tra Otto e Novecento in Valle Vigezzo", Skira, Milan, 2007
 Davide Brullo: "Appassionata incompetenza. I primi cinquant'anni della collezione Poscio", Madame Webb, Domodossola, 2011

References

External links
 Online gallery of portraits by Gian Maria Rastellini
 A gallery of Rastellini's paintings in Collezione Poscio, Domodossola
 Archives of  exhibitions 
 Archives of exhibitions at Collezione Poscio 

Landscape painters
Portrait painters
1869 births
1927 deaths
19th-century Italian painters
20th-century Italian painters
People from Santa Maria Maggiore, Piedmont